AllFrumTha I (pronounced "All-From-The-Eye") is the debut studio album by American West Coast hip hop duo Allfrumtha I. It was released on April 21, 1998 through Priority Records. Production was handled by Allfrumtha I, Dâm-Funk and Rick "Dutch" Cousin, with Mack 10 serving as executive producer. It features guest appearances from Mack 10, Boo Kapone, CJ Mac, Ice Cube, Road Dawgs, Soultre, The Comrads and WC. The album peaked at number 168 on the Billboard 200, at number 6 on the Billboard Top Heatseekers and at number 32 on the Billboard Top R&B/Hip-Hop Albums.

Along with singles, music videos were released for the songs: "County Jail" and "Fill My Cup". The video for "County Jail" features cameo appearances by Westside Connection, CJ Mac, The Comrads and Daz Dillinger.

The song "Get Yo Bang On" was originally heard in the film Gang Related and was also included in the film's soundtrack.

Critical reception 
AllMusic – "...Allfrumtha I's eponymous debut appears to fulfill the potential of their cameos on the celebrated Westside Connection and Mack 10 albums...Allfrumtha I is a West Coast duo with enormous potential."

The Source (6/98, p. 162) – "...the two serve up a scrumptious musical meal for fans to devour....this solid LP proves that these newcomers will be mainstays in this rap game."

Vibe (5/98, p. 149) – "...Allfrumtha I is...just something to band while on the west side of your town..."

Track listing 

Notes
"County Jail" contains a sample from "So Ruff So Tuff", written by R. Troutman and L. Troutman
"Make You Dance" contains an interpolation of "I Can Make You Dance", written by R. Troutman and L. Troutman

Charts

References

External links

1998 debut albums
Allfrumtha I albums
Priority Records albums